Bran, also known as miller's bran, is the hard layers of cereal grain surrounding the endosperm. It consists of the combined aleurone and pericarp. Corn (maize) bran also includes the pedicel (tip cap).  Along with the germ, it is an integral part of whole grains, and is often produced as a byproduct of milling in the production of refined grains.

Bran is present in cereal grain, including rice, corn (maize), wheat, oats, barley, rye and millet. Bran is not the same as chaff, which is a coarser scaly material surrounding the grain but not forming part of the grain itself, and which is indigestible by humans.

Composition

Bran is particularly rich in dietary fiber and essential fatty acids and contains significant quantities of starch, protein, vitamins, and dietary minerals. It is also a source of phytic acid, an antinutrient that prevents nutrient absorption.

The high oil content of bran makes it subject to rancidification, one of the reasons that it is often separated from the grain before storage or further processing. Bran is often heat-treated to increase its longevity.

Rice bran 
Rice bran is a byproduct of the rice milling process (the conversion of brown rice to white rice), and it contains various antioxidants. A major rice bran fraction contains 12%–13% oil and highly unsaponifiable components (4.3%). This fraction contains tocotrienols (a form of vitamin E), gamma-oryzanol and beta-sitosterol; all these constituents may contribute to the lowering of the plasma levels of the various parameters of the lipid profile. Rice bran also contains a high level of dietary fibres (beta-glucan, pectin and gum). It also contains ferulic acid, which is also a component of the structure of nonlignified cell walls. However, some research suggests there are levels of inorganic arsenic present in rice bran. One study found the levels to be 20% higher than in contaminated drinking water.

Uses

Bran is often used to enrich breads (notably muffins) and breakfast cereals, especially for the benefit of those wishing to increase their intake of dietary fiber. Bran may also be used for pickling (nukazuke) as in the tsukemono of Japan.   Rice bran in particular finds many uses in Japan, where it is known as nuka. Besides using it for pickling, Japanese people add it to the water when boiling bamboo shoots, and use it for dish washing. In Kitakyushu City, it is called jinda and used for stewing fish, such as sardine.

Rice bran is stuck to the surface of commercial ice blocks to prevent them from melting . Bran oil may be also extracted for use by itself for industrial purposes (such as in the paint industry), or as a cooking oil, such as rice bran oil.

 Wheat bran is useful as feed for poultry and other livestock, as part of a balanced ration with other inputs. Wheatings, a milling byproduct comprising mostly bran with some pieces of endosperm also left over, are included in this category.

Bran was found to be the most successful slug deterrent by BBC's TV programme Gardeners' World.  It is a common substrate and food source used for feeder insects, such as mealworms and waxworms. Wheat bran has also been used for tanning leather since at least the 16th century.

Brewing
George Washington had a recipe for small beer involving bran, hops, and molasses.

Research

As with cereal fibre and whole grain consumption, bran is under preliminary research for the potential to improve nutrition and affect chronic diseases.

Stability
It is common practice to heat-treat bran with the intention of slowing undesirable rancidification. However, a very detailed 2003 study of heat-treatment of oat bran found a complex pattern whereby increasingly intense heat treatment reduced the development of hydrolytic rancidity and bitterness with time, but increased oxidative rancidity. The authors recommended that heat treatment should be sufficient to achieve selective lipase inactivation, but not so much as to render the polar lipids oxidisable upon prolonged storage.

See also
 Alkylresorcinols
 Cereal germ
 Chaff
 Dietary fiber
 Phytic acid (IP6)
 Rice bran solubles
 Raisin bran

References

Cereals
Food ingredients
Oats
By-products